Chop Chop may refer to:

Arts, entertainment, and media

Fictional characters
Chop Chop, a character in the Blackhawk comic book series
Chop Chop, an Undead character in Skylanders: Spyro's Adventure

Music
Chop Chop (band), an electropop band out of Los Angeles
Chop Chop (Bell X1 album), 2013
Chop Chop (The Academy Is... album), the working title of the album Santi
Chop Chop, the title of Shwa Losben's 2008 indie rock album
"Chop Chop" (song), the second single by rap group YoungBloodZ
"Chop-Chop", a 1982 single by British post-punk band Killing Joke

Other uses in arts, entertainment, and media
Chop Chop (2001 film), a Danish comedy film directed by Niels Arden Oplev
Chop Chop (2020 film), an American horror thriller film

Places
Chop Chop, Iran, a village in Zanjan Province, Iran
Chop Chop Square, a name given to Deera Square in Riyadh, Saudi Arabia.

Other uses
Chop Chop (horse) (1940–1963), a Canadian Horse Racing Hall of Fame racehorse
Chop chop (phrase), equivalent to "hurry" or "do it quickly"
Chop-chop (tobacco), Australian English for home-grown tobacco
DeMarcus "Chop Chop" Corley (born 1974), American boxer

See also
Chop shop